Solar power represented a very small part of electricity production in the United Kingdom until the 2010s when it increased rapidly, thanks to feed-in tariff (FIT) subsidies and the falling cost of photovoltaic (PV) panels.

, installed capacity was over 13.5gigawatt (GW), with the 72MW(DC) Shotwick Solar Farm being the largest in the UK.
Annual generation was slightly under 13TWh in 2020 (4.1% of UK electricity consumption), and peak generation was less than 10GW.
Solar PV panels have a capacity factor of around 10% in the UK climate. In October 2022, home rooftop solar panels were estimated to pay back their cost in ten to twenty years.

Solar potential 

The UK's annual insolation is in the range of 750–1,100kilowatt-hours per square metre (kWh/m2). 
London receives 0.52 and 4.74kWh/m2 per day in December and July, respectively. 
While the sunniest parts of the UK receive much less solar radiation than the sunniest parts of Europe, the country's insolation in the south is comparable with that of central European countries, including Germany, which generates about 7% of its electricity from solar power. 
Additionally, the UK's higher wind speeds cool PV modules, leading to higher efficiencies than could be expected at these levels of insolation. The Department of Energy and Climate Change (DECC) assumes an average capacity factor of 9.7% for solar photovoltaics in the UK.

Derry Newman, chief executive of Solarcentury, argues that the UK's "famously overcast weather does not make it an unsuitable place for solar power, as solar panels work on daylight, not necessarily direct sunlight." Some solar cells work better in direct sunlight, others can use more diffuse light. While insolation rates are lower in England than France and Spain, they are still usable.

Solar PV installed capacity and generation

Solar PV deployment in the UK. Capacity in megawatt (MWp)

Source: DECC – Department of Energy & Climate Change, Statistics – Solar photovoltaics deployment (period from 2010 onward)The table above shows electricity production from solar panels as a percentage of the final consumption of electricity in the UK and not gross supply to the grid. These numbers may be updated as the UK government has an average time lag of around 6months in completing the backlog of officially processing the large number of solar installations.

History 

In 2006, the United Kingdom had installed about 12MW of photovoltaic capacity, which represented only 0.3% of total European solar PV of 3,400MW. In August 2006, there was widespread news coverage in the United Kingdom of the major high street electrical retailers Currys' decision to stock PV modules, manufactured by Sharp, at a cost of £1,000 per module. The retailer also provided an installation service.

Solar power installations increased rapidly in subsequent years, as a result of reductions in the cost of PV panels, and the introduction of a feed-in-tariff (FiT) subsidy in April 2010.

FiT payments for new installations were cut a review announced by DECC on 9June 2011. As a result, large arrays of solar panels became a less attractive investment opportunity for developers, especially for projects greater than 250kW, so large field arrays such as these were less likely to be built beyond the 1 August 2011 cut-off date. At the end of 2011, there were 230,000 solar power projects in the UK, with a total installed generating capacity of 750MW.

In 2012, the government announced that 4million homes across the UK would be powered by the sun within eight years, representing 22 gigawatts (GW) of installed solar power capacity by 2020. At the end of September 2013, retailer IKEA announced that solar panel packages for houses would be sold at 17 UK stores by July 2014. The decision followed a successful pilot project at their Thurrock store, during which one system was sold almost every day. The panels were manufactured by the Chinese company Hanergy. This partnership did not last and in October 2015 Ikea ended its relationship with Hanergy.

By 2016 the total installed capacity was over 10,000MW. In the summer half-year from April to September 2016, UK solar panels produced more electricity (6,964GWh) than did coal power (6,342GWh); each meeting about 5% of demand.

UK solar PV installed capacity at the end of 2017 was 12.8GW, representing a 3.4% share of total electricity generation. Provisionally, as of the end of January 2019 there was 13,123MW installed UK solar capacity across 979,983 installations. This is an increase of 323MW in slightly more than a year. A new record peak generation from photovoltaics was set at 9.68GW on 20 April 2020.

New solar PV installations slowed in 2020, though to a lesser extent, with 217MW being added in 2020 compared with 273MW in 2019. COVID-19 restrictions may have caused delays in some projects.

Solar PV by size of installations

Residential solar PV 

According to a report on behalf of the European Commission, in 2015 the United Kingdom had 2,499MW of residential solar PV capacity, with 775,000residential solar PV producers, representing 2.7% of households. The average size of residential solar PV systems was estimated to be 3.25kW, and the technical potential for residential solar PV in the United Kingdom was estimated at 41,636MW.

MCS (Microgeneration Certification Scheme) claim 61,320 UK properties had solar panels installed in 2021, an increase of 71% on the previous year. The average payback time for residential solar PV in the UK was 11.4 years as of 2015, but subsequent increases in the price of domestic energy have significantly decreased this. The April 2022 rise in the price cap saw payback times reduced on average by 2.5 years.

Some of the advantages of small scale residential solar include eliminating the need for extra land, keeping cost saving advantages in local communities and empowering households to become producer/consumers of renewable electricity, raising awareness of wasteful consumption habits and environmental issues through direct experience. It will take anything from 4 to 20years to recoup the money spent on solar panels, this depends on a number of factors for example how many modules you have, how big they are, if they are south facing and where you live. Some studies have found that feed in tariff schemes have disproportionately benefited wealthier households with little or no assistance to help poorer household access financial loans or affordable schemes, whilst the costs of schemes are distributed evenly across utility bills.

In his Spring Statement of March 2022, Chancellor Rishi Sunak announced a reduction of VAT on the installation of energy-saving materials (including solar PV systems) to 0% (previously 5%) for a period of five years from 1 April 2022, stating "the measure is intended to incentivise the take-up of ESMs in line with the government’s net zero objectives".

Large scale solar power parks 

The first solar park in Wales became operational in 2011 at Rhosygilwen, north Pembrokeshire.

On 13 July 2011, construction of the largest solar park in the United Kingdom was completed in Newark-on-Trent in Nottinghamshire. 
The 4.9MW free-field system was built in just seven weeks after being granted planning permission. 
The system generates an estimated 4,860MWh of electricity (an average power of 560kW) into the national grid each year.
There are several other examples of 45MW field arrays of photovoltaics in the UK, including the 5MW Language Solar Park, the 5MW Westmill Solar Farm, the 4.51MW Marsten Solar Farm and Toyota's 4.6MW plant in Burnaston, Derbyshire.

The first large solar farm in the United Kingdom, a 32MW solar farm, began construction in November 2012 in Leicestershire, between the runways of the former military airfield, Wymeswold.

As of June 2014 there were 18 schemes generating more than 5MW and 34 in planning or construction in Wales.

Planning considerations 
Adding solar panels to the external elevations and roofs of a dwelling will change the appearance of both the property and the local street view. This in some cases will require planning permission from the local authority. For a Listed Building or in a Conservation Area, planning permission is mandatory. Otherwise, the owner of a domestic dwelling where solar panels are being installed can in most cases proceed under their Permitted Development rights, as long as certain height limitations are adhered to.

Government programmes 

The Energy Saving Trust that administers government grants for domestic photovoltaic systems, the Low Carbon Building Programme, estimates that an installation for an average-sized house would cost between £5,000–£8,000, with most domestic systems usually between 1.5 and 3kWp, and yield annual savings between £150 and £200 (in 2008).

The Green Energy for Schools programme was intended to provide 100 schools across the UK with solar panels. The first school in Wales was at Tavernspite, in Pembrokeshire, and received panels worth £20,000.

That equates to 25 million tons of CO2 per year from UK domestic electricity consumption. , there is no compulsion for new builds to incorporate any solar power generation.

Feed-in tariff 

Discussion on implementation of a feed-in tariff programme concluded on 26 September 2008, and the results were published in 2009. The UK government agreed in April 2010 to pay for all grid-connected generated electricity at an initial rate of up to 41.3pence (US$0.67) per kWh, whether used locally or exported. The rates proved more attractive than necessary, and in August 2011, were drastically reduced for installations over 50kW, a policy change criticised as marking "the end of the UK's solar industry as we know it". Subsequently, feed-in tariff rates were adjusted annually by the government, and a requirement was introduced for new claims that the home's rating on the Energy Performance Certificate (EPC) had to be 'D' or better. The amount of electricity exported is not usually measured for domestic installations; instead it is calculated by assuming that 50% of the electricity produced is exported into the grid.

The Department for Business, Energy and Industrial Strategy published a consultation on 19 July 2018, stating their intention to close the FIT scheme to new applicants from 1 April 2019 and not replace it with a new subsidy.

The Feed-in Tariff was closed to new entries on 1 April 2019, but households are still able to claim on existing tariffs where available.

Smart Export Guarantee 
On 10 June 2019, Ofgem announced that BEIS had introduced the Smart Export Guarantee (SEG), in force from 1 January 2020. This is not a direct replacement of the feed-in tariff scheme, but rather a new initiative that rewards solar generators for electricity exported to the grid. Energy suppliers with more than 150,000 domestic customers must provide at least one export tariff. The export tariff rate must be greater than zero. Export is measured by smart meters which the energy supplier will install free of charge.

The SEG is available to households that generate up to 5kW from solar PV, wind, micro-combined heat and power, hydro or anaerobic digestion.

Contract for Difference 

The Contract for Difference (CfD) scheme, introduced in 2013 to replace the Renewables Obligation, excluded solar PV schemes from the competitive auctions in 2015. The majority of successful CfD auction bidders came from the wind sector. In 2020 the UK government reversed this decision, opening the door for PV projects to compete in the CfD auctions against onshore wind projects.

Future
Decentralised smaller scale generators which are not connected directly to the transmission network are forecast to increase. New solar farms and battery storage may help to meet increased demand from electric vehicles.

See also

Renewable energy in the United Kingdom
Renewable energy in Scotland
Energy use and conservation in the United Kingdom
Energy policy of the United Kingdom
Green electricity in the United Kingdom
Solar energy in the European Union
Renewable energy by country
UK-ISES
United Kingdom National Renewable Energy Action Plan

References

External links

UK's First Solar Plant Gets Go-ahead: A disused tin mine is set to host the UK's first solar panel park after winning approval from Cornwall Council.
Energy statistics from DECC
Feed-in Tariff Installation Report

 
Electric power generation in the United Kingdom